Paul Lamb (born 9 July 1955, Blyth, Northumberland, England) is a British blues harmonica player and bandleader. He has had a four-decade long career as a blues harmonicist and bandleader, with fans around the world.

Biography
Lamb started playing the harmonica during his childhood, inspired by Sonny Terry, and he was fortunate to meet and collaborate with him after beginning to perform in clubs by the age of fifteen. Lamb played only acoustic blues until about 1980. Lamb also played alongside his heroes such as Buddy Guy, Junior Wells, and Brownie McGhee. He formed the Blues Burglars with guitarist Johnny Whitehill in the early 1980s, a formation that eventually became Paul Lamb & the King Snakes. They released an eponymous album with Ace Records in 1990, followed by several others, each building both Lamb's personal reputation as a harmonica player and the band's prestige. He was awarded the British Blues Connection's annual award for the best local harmonica player several years in a row while the King Snakes frequently took the title as best band.

As a consequence, his own harmonica skills have been in demand, and he had a hit in 1994 in the UK Singles Chart with the track, "Harmonica Man" (under the pseudonym of Bravado) with Pete Waterman. Lamb has also worked with Mark Knopfler, The Who and Jimmy Nail, played on BBC and film soundtracks, and various television commercials in the UK.

Lamb was more recently inducted into the British Blues Awards Hall of Fame. Blues & Rhythm magazine described his band as "lazily cocksure and coolly aggressive".

In 2011 he recorded a session for Paul Jones' BBC Radio 2 show.

Members of the King Snakes band have included singer/guitarists Johnny Dickinson and Chad Strentz, bassists Jim Mercer, Dave Stevens, and Rod Demick, drummers Mike Thorne, Martin Deegan, Alan Savage, Daniel Strittmatter, and Sonny Below, and Paul's son Ryan on lead guitar.

In 2018 the band includes Paul Lamb, Ryan Lamb, Chad Strentz, Rod Demick and drummer Mike Thorne.

Discography
Paul Lamb & the King Snakes (1990)
Fine Condition (1995)
She's a Killer (1996)
Shifting into Gear (1997)
John Henry Jumps In (1998)
The Blue Album (1999)
Blues Burglars Whoopin''' (1999)Take Your Time and Get It Right (2000)Live at the 100 Club (2002)I'm on a Roll (2005)Snakes and Ladders Live (2007)Mind Games (2010)The Games People Play (2012)Hole in the Wall (2014)After Hours  (2016)Live At The Royal Albert Hall'' (2017)

References

External links

[ Biography] at Allmusic

1955 births
Living people
British blues musicians
British harmonica players
Blues harmonica players
Harmonica blues musicians
People from Blyth, Northumberland